La Croce is a village in Tuscany, central Italy,  administratively a frazione of the comune of Buti, province of Pisa.

La Croce is about 24 km from Pisa and 2 km from Buti.

References

Bibliography 
 

Frazioni of the Province of Pisa